Harry L. Givan (August 26, 1911 – December 16, 1999) was an American amateur golfer, insurance executive, and co-founder of Seattle's Northwest Hospital & Medical Center. He is regarded as one of the best golfers in the history of the Pacific Northwest. His major national achievement was being selected for the U.S. team in the 1936 Walker Cup. Sports Illustrated ranked Givan 37th among the best 50 athletes in Washington state in the 20th century.

Early life 
Givan was born in Sequim, Washington on August 26, 1911. When he was nine, his parents moved him and his sister to his uncle's residence in Seattle. He played his first golf tournament in 1923 at Inglewood Golf Club, acing the 12th hole at age 11. He won his first tournament two years later.

Givan attended Lincoln High School in Seattle's Wallingford neighborhood. He tried out for football, baseball, basketball, and golf. Golf was his least favorite of the sports he then played. He and a friend decided to earn extra money by caddying at Seattle Golf Club. He learned to play by watching Bob Johnstone, a professional who won the Northwest Open eight times.

To raise spending money and money for golf clubs, Givan boxed at the old Austin & Salt Gymnasium at 9th and Olive in Seattle. Fighters earned $3 for going the distance in a fight, and $5 for a knockout. He scored 22 knockouts.

College and early golf career 
By the time he graduated from Lincoln High, Givan had 19 scholarship offers. He also had an offer to play professional baseball for the San Francisco Seals. To the astonishment of the team's manager, Jim Caveny, Givan turned down a lucrative contract offer citing the fact that he wanted to go to school.

Givan attended the University of Washington and became captain of the golf team.

His golf breakthrough came when he won Seattle's City Caddy Championship at the original Glendale Country Club shooting 75.

1930s 
Givan played his first PNGA Amateur at the age of 18 in 1929. He lost to Lloyd Nordstrom, a star golfer from Sand Point Country Club in Seattle. He did not golf much in the early '30s concentrating instead on studying and earning money to get through school. He graduated from the University of Washington in 1933 with honors in Engineering. He immediately went to work for Puget Sound Power & Light.

Later that same year, Givan again entered the PNGA Amateur. He qualified with a 66, and eventually beat Bob White 3 & 1. In 1935, he won the Amateur at Seattle Golf Club beating Scotty Campbell on the 37th hole. He was a surprise selection to the U.S. 1936 Walker Cup team.

World War II and after 
During World War II, Givan served in the Coast Guard Reserve.

After the war, he began selling insurance for Johnson Higgins. He eventually moved up to manage the company until he retired at the age of 62 to, "make more time for golf".

During the 1950s, he was among a group of business men who helped obtain funding and land for Northwest Hospital & Medical Center in North Seattle. He chaired its board for several years.

Givan's first wife Velma predeceased him. They were married for 49 years before her death. He remarried Peggy Ratliff, who was by his side at his death.

Death 
Givan died December 16, 1999 at Northwest Hospital & Medical Center of emphysema. He was 88.

Tournament wins
this list is incomplete
1936 Pacific Northwest Amateur, Washington Open
1937 Pacific Northwest Amateur
1942 Northwest Open
1945 Pacific Northwest Amateur
1946 Pacific Northwest Amateur
1961 Pacific Northwest Amateur

American male golfers
Amateur golfers
Golfers from Seattle
People from Sequim, Washington
Respiratory disease deaths in Washington (state)
Deaths from emphysema
1911 births
1999 deaths